Kevin Joseph McIntyre (December 27, 1960 – January 2, 2019) was an American attorney and government official who served as a member and Chairman of the Federal Energy Regulatory Commission (FERC). Prior to his role at FERC, he was co-leader of the global energy practice at the law firm Jones Day. At Jones Day, McIntyre's legal practice focused on compliance and enforcement, energy trading, competition issues, and energy exports.

Early life 
Born at Dover Air Force Base in Delaware, he was educated at San Diego State University and at Georgetown Law School.

McIntyre died on January 2, 2019, from brain cancer at his home in Arlington, Virginia, aged 58.

References

External links
 Biography at FERC

1960 births
2019 deaths
People from Kent County, Delaware
San Diego State University alumni
Georgetown University Law Center alumni
21st-century American lawyers
Trump administration personnel
Deaths from cancer in Virginia
Deaths from brain cancer in the United States
Federal Energy Regulatory Commission chairpersons